Balkaya is a village in the Sapanca district in the Sakarya Province in Turkey. It is located about 70 miles southeast of Istanbul. It is also about five miles south of Lake Sapanca.

Villages in Sakarya Province